Daniel Matthew Pratt (born 31 January 1986) is an English cricketer. Pratt is a right-handed batsman who fields as a wicket-keeper. He was born in Croydon, Surrey.

While studying for his degree at Loughborough University, Pratt made his first-class debut for Loughborough UCCE against Surrey in 2008. He made two further first-class appearances in 2008, against Gloucestershire and Worcestershire. In his three first-class matches, he scored 52 runs at an average of 26.00, with a high score of 47. Behind the stumps he took 2 catches and made a single stumping.

References

External links
Daniel Pratt at ESPNcricinfo
Daniel Pratt at CricketArchive

1986 births
Living people
Cricketers from Croydon
Alumni of Loughborough University
English cricketers
Loughborough MCCU cricketers